Boroughbridge is a town and civil parish in the Harrogate district of North Yorkshire, England. Until a bypass was built the town lay on the main A1 road from London to Edinburgh, which crosses the River Ure here.

The civil parish includes the villages of Aldborough and Minskip.

History

Toponymy
The origin of the name 'Boroughbridge' lies in its location relative to Aldborough, the principal settlement during the Roman period and known as Isurium Brigantum. Dere Street, the Roman road heading north from York, originally crossed the River Ure just north of Aldborough, but at an unknown date the road was diverted to cross the river at Boroughbridge. The place was first mentioned in 1155 in the Latin form pontem de Burgo and by 1298 in the English form Burghbrig ('the bridge near Burgh or Aldborough'). A new town grew up at the bridge and the Old Town became known as the 'Ald-Borough'.

Early

A line of three menhirs, or standing stones, known as the Devil's Arrows, believed to have been erected in the Bronze Age, can be found on the outskirts of Boroughbridge, by the side of the A1. The stones are of millstone grit, probably quarried from Plompton, the closest source of this material. The stones stand on an almost north–south alignment, with the central stone slightly offset. The first reference to the stones is from the journal of a fisherman, Peter Frankck, who visited Boroughbridge in 1694 and claims he saw seven stones. The antiquarian John Leyland saw four stones, which is the verifiable number. The absent fourth stone stood close to the central stone and was dug out and broken up, allegedly by treasure hunters. Most of it was used to build Peg Bridge, which crosses the River Tutt as it enters the town. According to tradition the top of the fourth stone was to be found in the grounds of Aldborough Hall, which stands between Boroughbridge and Aldborough.

Medieval
Boroughbridge was not mentioned in Domesday Book but was later described as part of the manor of Aldborough. In 1229 Boroughbridge, as part of the manor of Aldborough, was granted to Hubert de Burgh, but was forfeited a few years later by his son, who fought against the king at the Battle of Evesham. It then remained a royal manor until Charles I granted it to several citizens of London.

In 1318 Boroughbridge was devastated by the Scots under Sir James Douglas following the Capture of Berwick upon Tweed.

In 1322 the Battle of Boroughbridge took place as King Edward II overpowered Thomas, Earl of Lancaster, bringing about the end of Edward II's retaliation against those who had opposed him in the Despenser War of 1321–22.

Modern

From medieval times Boroughbridge was part of the parish of Aldborough in the West Riding of Yorkshire. In 1553 it became a parliamentary borough, electing two Members of Parliament to the unreformed House of Commons. It had a burgage franchise, meaning that the right to vote was tied to ownership of certain of property in the borough and had fewer than 100 qualified voters by the time it was abolished in the Reform Act of 1832. It was a pocket borough under the control of the Dukes of Newcastle. Augustus FitzRoy, who was Prime Minister as the 3rd Duke of Grafton, was elected MP for Boroughbridge in 1756 but never sat for the borough, preferring to represent Bury St Edmunds, where he had also been elected.

Boroughbridge was an important stage for stagecoaches because of its position on the Great North Road midway between London and Edinburgh. An advertisement in the Edinburgh Courant for 1754 reads: 

Boroughbridge became a separate civil parish in 1866. In 1938 the civil parish absorbed the parishes of Aldborough and Minskip.
 
In 1945 the bridge carrying the A1 road over the River Ure collapsed under the weight of a heavy vehicle carrying an 80-ton steel mill roll housing from Sheffield to Falkirk. The incident interrupted the main transport route for a short time and the army installed a Bailey bridge until repairs were completed.

In 1974 Boroughbridge was transferred from the West Riding to the new county of North Yorkshire.

In 2011 the town's sewage works, which serves a population of ten thousand, was upgraded, with the old bar screens, which had reached the end of their working life, being replaced with modern wire-mesh drum screens able to screen out an increasingly large amount of undesirable waste and also filter grit and fat, thus decreasing the load on the plant.  They were designed to meet the plant's stringent outfall requirements as set out by the Environment Agency. The settling and humus tanks were also upgraded from old manual sludging under hydrostatic head to circular tanks fitted with scrapers to desludge the tanks automatically.

Governance
An electoral ward of the same name exists. At the 2011 Census this ward had a population of 3,104.

Education
Boroughbridge has both a primary school and a secondary school. Boroughbridge High School, which has a library, computer rooms and a drama studio, marked its 25th anniversary in the summer of 2007.

Location grid

See also 
 Boroughbridge (UK Parliament constituency)

References

External links

Boroughbridge Community Website
History and other information about Boroughbridge
Boroughbridge Guide
Boroughbridge Town Council 

 
Towns in North Yorkshire
Civil parishes in North Yorkshire